The Pontifical Biblical Institute (also known as Biblicum) is a research and postgraduate teaching institution specialised in biblical and ancient Near Eastern studies. It is an institution of the Holy See entrusted to the Society of Jesus.

History
The Pontifical Biblical Institute was founded by Pope Pius X in the apostolic letter Vinea Electa in 1909 as a centre of advanced studies in Holy Scripture. At first, the institute prepared students for exams at the Pontifical Biblical Commission. In 1916, it was licensed by Pope Benedict XV to grant academic degrees in the name of the commission. In 1928, it was licensed by Pope Pius XI to grant doctorates in affiliation with the Pontifical Gregorian University, independently of the commission. In 1927, a branch was opened in Jerusalem by Alexis Mallon. In 1932, the Oriental Faculty was founded.

Rectors 
All of its rectors have been Jesuit priests. Cardinal Bea is particularly noteworthy for having defended the university against charges of Modernism before the Second Vatican Council.

Alumni   
Among the prominent alumni of the Biblicum, the following were elevated to the episcopate and/or the cardinalate:

See also
 École Biblique
 Studium Biblicum Franciscanum
 List of Jesuit sites

References

External links

Apostolic Letter - Vinea Electa, Pope Pius X, 7 May 1909, Vatican website (Latin)

 
1909 establishments in Italy
Biblical studies organizations
Catholic universities and colleges in Italy
Educational institutions established in 1909
Jesuit universities and colleges
Pontifical Gregorian University
Properties of the Holy See